The 2015 Asian Cycling Championships took place at the King’s 80th Birthday Anniversary Velodrome in Nakhon Ratchasima, Thailand from 4 to 14 February 2015.

Medal summary

Road

Men

Women

Track

Men

Women

Medal table

References
Results

External links
 Asian Cycling Federation

Asia
Asia
Asian Cycling Championships
Asian Cycling Championships
Cycling in Thailand
International cycle races hosted by Thailand
Cycling Championships